Rachael Martin is the former mayor of Maryville, Missouri." She was appointed April 10, 2018 after serving two years as mayor pro tem.

Martin was first elected to the City Council in April 2014 at the age of 27 
and is the youngest person to serve as mayor of Maryville.

Martin is on the Board of Directors for the Maryville Chamber of Commerce and the Board of Directors for the Maryville Downtown Improvement Organization. She holds a Bachelor of Science in Marketing from Northwest Missouri State University.

References

External links
 Official website

Women mayors of places in Missouri
Missouri city council members
People from Maryville, Missouri
Living people
Year of birth missing (living people)
Women city councillors in Missouri
Northwest Missouri State University alumni
21st-century American women